Vittoria Titomanlio (22 April 1899 – 28 December 1988) was an Italian politician. She was elected to the Constituent Assembly in 1946 as one of the first group of women parliamentarians in Italy. She subsequently served in the Chamber of Deputies from 1948 to 1968.

Biography
Titomanlio was born in Barletta in 1899 to Carolina De Boffe and Sabino Titomanlio. After graduating with a master's degree, she became a primary school teacher. She joined the young women's section of Azione Cattolica, rising to become a member of its superior council.

Following the war, Titomanlio was a Christian Democracy (DC) candidate in Naples in the 1946 general elections, in which she was one of 21 women elected to the Constituent Assembly. She was elected to the Chamber of Deputies in 1948 and was re-elected in 1953, 1958 and 1963, serving until 1968.

She died in Naples in 1988.

References

1899 births
People from Barletta
Italian schoolteachers
Christian Democracy (Italy) politicians
Members of the Constituent Assembly of Italy
Members of the Chamber of Deputies (Italy)
1986 deaths
20th-century Italian women politicians
Women members of the Chamber of Deputies (Italy)